Hangenbieten is a commune in the Bas-Rhin department and Grand Est region of north-eastern France.

The name is a contraction of the former Hangenbietenheim.

Geography
Hangenbieten lies 2 km north of Strasbourg Airport and 10 km west of central Strasbourg. The village is traversed by the Canal de la Bruche, built by Vauban following King Louis XIV of France's annexation of the Prince-Bishopric of Strasbourg in 1681. The canal connects Strasbourg to Molsheim and is followed by a cycle path.

See also
 Communes of the Bas-Rhin department

References

Bas-Rhin communes articles needing translation from French Wikipedia
Communes of Bas-Rhin